Samuel Oben Ojong (born August 6, 1980) is a retired Cameroonian professional footballer who played as a striker.

He played on the professional level in the Swiss Super League for FC Sion, SR Delémont, Neuchâtel Xamax and FC Thun.

External links
 

1980 births
Living people
Association football forwards
Cameroonian footballers
Cameroonian expatriate footballers
Expatriate footballers in Switzerland
Expatriate footballers in France
Championnat National players
Championnat National 2 players
Swiss Super League players
FC Rouen players
FC Sion players
SR Delémont players
Neuchâtel Xamax FCS players
FC Thun players
Red Star F.C. players
Thonon Evian Grand Genève F.C. players
UJA Maccabi Paris Métropole players